A Portland Rose is a type of garden rose.

Portland Rose or Portland Roses may also refer to:

 Portland Rose (train), a discontinued named passenger train in the united States 
 Portland Rose Festival, an annual festival Portland, Oregon
 Portland Rosebuds (disambiguation), professional men's sports teams in Portland, Oregon

See also 
 Portland Rose Garden (disambiguation)